Wireless: Acoustic Sessions is British progressive metal band Threshold's third Direct-to-Fan album, released in 2003. The album contains acoustic remixes of past songs and two songs written before the band got their first recording contract signed. The CD was out of print, but was reissued in 2008, and is available as a download on iTunes and Yahoo! Music.

Track listing

 "Fragmentation" (4.05)
 "Consume To Live" (5.03)
 "Seventh Angel" (2.37) (previously unreleased)
 "The Sheltering Sky" (4.37)
 "Part Of The Chaos" (4.40)
 "Innocent" (4.04)
 "Falling Away" (5.22)
 "Conceal The Face" (4.18) (previously unreleased)
 "Lovelorn" (3.17)
 "Narcissus" (3.55)

Multimedia section

Studio video of Fragmentation, hidden page +
+ To find the hidden page in the multimedia, click the left dish on the Exit screen.

Musicians

Mac: vocals
Karl Groom: acoustic guitar / bass
Nick Midson: acoustic guitar
Richard West: keyboards
Johanne James: drums

Wireless (album)
2003 remix albums